Joseph Jee  (9 February 1819 – 17 March 1899) was an English recipient of the Victoria Cross, the highest and most prestigious award for gallantry in the face of the enemy that can be awarded to British and Commonwealth forces.

Details
Jee was 38 years old, and a surgeon in the 78th Regiment (later The Seaforth Highlanders Ross-shire Buffs, Duke of Albany's), British Army during the Indian Mutiny when the following deed took place on 25 September 1857, at the relief of Lucknow, for which he was awarded the VC:

Further information
He later achieved the rank of deputy surgeon general.

The medal
His Victoria Cross is displayed at the Army Medical Services Museum, Mytchett, Surrey.

References

Location of grave and VC medal (Leicestershire)
Deputy Inspector General J. Jee

1819 births
1899 deaths
Burials in Leicestershire
Military personnel from Warwickshire
British Army regimental surgeons
British recipients of the Victoria Cross
78th Highlanders officers
Indian Rebellion of 1857 recipients of the Victoria Cross
15th The King's Hussars officers
1st The Royal Dragoons officers
57th Regiment of Foot officers
British military personnel of the Anglo-Persian War
Companions of the Order of the Bath
People from the Borough of North Warwickshire
British Army recipients of the Victoria Cross